The president of Turkmenistan, officially the president and chairman of the Cabinet of Ministers of Turkmenistan, is the head of state and head of government of Turkmenistan. The president is also the supreme commander in chief of the Armed Forces of Turkmenistan and heads the State Security Council.

Serdar Berdimuhamedow is the current president of Turkmenistan, the third in the history of the country since it gained independence with the dissolution of the Soviet Union in 1991. He succeeded his father, Gurbanguly Berdimuhamedow when the latter stepped down in 2022 after a reign of 15 years, the first president to do so. In the 2022 election, Berdimuhamedow received 72.97% of the country's popular vote against nine other candidates. The country passed reforms in 2016 eliminating term limits for the presidency and removing the previous age requirement of below 70, as well as extending the term from five to seven years.

Requirements for presidents, removal from office, and succession 

Requirements for candidates for president of Turkmenistan include the following:

 Must have been born in Turkmenistan
 Must be fluent in Turkmen 
 Must be at least 40 years old 
 Must have resided in Turkmenistan for the past 15 consecutive years
 Must be employed

The powers of the president of Turkmenistan may be terminated in accordance with article 57 of the Turkmen constitution in the event of:
 Inability to perform their duties due to illness
 Violation of the constitution and public laws
 A vote of no confidence in the president

Should the president be removed from office as well as the in event of death or resignation, the chairman of the Assembly is legally appointed as acting president, with elections being held no later than 60 days after the fact. This has never taken place; in 2006, when Turkmenistan's only presidential vacancy occurred due to Nyýazow's death in office, the State Security Council of Turkmenistan transferred the right to act as President to the first deputy chairman of the Cabinet of Ministers on an ad-hoc basis. The requirement that an acting president does not have the right to run for president was also dropped.

Residence

The Oguzkhan Presidential Palace is the principal residence/workplace of the president, located on Independence Square in Ashgabat. The various halls of the palace are used to receive foreign leaders and sign presidential decrees. Former President Saparmyrat Nyýazow owned a private residence in an official residence in Arshabil, a town 28 kilometres outside of Ashgabat.

Transport and security

The president of Turkmenistan utilises a specially made Boeing 777-200LR, painted in the national colours, during international and regional visits. These planes are provided by Turkmenistan Airlines. The president employs a Mercedes-Benz S-Class vehicle to transport him throughout the capital city. On some occasions, the vehicle is escorted by a mounted troop from the armed forces. The president also utilises trains to transport them from one place to another.

The ' Presidential Security Service (Prezidentiniň howpsuzlyk gullugy) is responsible for ensuring the protection and security of the president. Established in November 1990, it is a direct reporting body of the President of Turkmenistan. In the early 1990s, the Presidential Security Service was removed from the National Security Committee and transformed into an independent body. On 23 September 1994, the Law of Turkmenistan "On the operative-search activity" came into force, according to which one of the main tasks of the service is to ensure the security of the President of Turkmenistan. During state visits to foreign countries, the service provides at least 10 agents to protect the president. The Presidential Security Service is organised in the following way:

Secretariat
Duty Division
1st Division (Personal guard of the president)
2nd Division
3rd Division
4th Division
Special Operations Regiment
1st Battalion 
2nd Battalion 
3rd Battalion

The Presidential Security Service is currently composed of 2,000 employees.

Heads of the Security Service

After the dismissal of Khojaberdiyev, the appointment of a new chief was not reported.

List of presidents of Turkmenistan

Timeline

Rank by time in office

See also
List of leaders of Turkmenistan
Prime Minister of Turkmenistan
Vice-President of Turkmenistan
State Security Council of Turkmenistan
Republican Party of Turkmenistan

References

External links
U.S. State Department profile of Turkmenistan
Republican Party of Turkmenistan

Politics of Turkmenistan
T
President
1990 establishments in Turkmenistan